Lesbra graueri is a species of beetle in the family Cerambycidae, and the only species in the genus Lesbra. It was described by Hintz in 1916.

References

Lamiini
Beetles described in 1916